Gregorio 'Goyo' Fonseca Recio (born 26 November 1965) is a Spanish former footballer who played as a forward.

Club career
Born in La Seca, Province of Valladolid, Castile and León, Fonseca amassed La Liga totals of 209 games and 50 goals over 11 seasons, representing Real Valladolid (nine years), RCD Espanyol and Albacete Balompié. He made his debut in the competition on 5 February 1984 whilst in service of the first of those clubs, starting in a 1–1 away draw against Real Zaragoza and scoring his team's goal.

In the 1991–92 campaign, Fonseca netted a career-best 15 goals, but Valladolid suffered relegation after ranking second-bottom. In Segunda División, he appeared for CD Málaga (on loan) and Espanyol – achieving promotion in 1994 – retiring in 1996 at the age of 30.

International career
Fonseca earned four caps for Spain in a seven-month span, three of those appearances being friendlies. His first arrived on 19 February 1992, as he played the full 90 minutes of the 1–1 draw with the CIS in Valencia.

International goals

References

External links

1965 births
Living people
Sportspeople from the Province of Valladolid
Spanish footballers
Footballers from Castile and León
Association football forwards
La Liga players
Segunda División players
Tercera División players
Real Valladolid Promesas players
Real Valladolid players
CD Málaga footballers
RCD Espanyol footballers
Albacete Balompié players
Spain youth international footballers
Spain international footballers